The orders, decorations, and medals of the Kingdom of Yugoslavia were inherited from the Kingdom of Serbia and also established during the Kingdom of Yugoslavia period from 1918 to 1945.

Orders

See also
Orders, decorations, and medals of the Socialist Federal Republic of Yugoslavia

External links
ROYAL ORDERS AND MEDALS-Official Website of the Serbian Royal Family